Julian Gonsalves is an Indian environmentalist.

Gonslaves  is originally from the region of Goa, in western India and he received a PhD in sustainable agriculture from the Cornell University.
has served as the vice-president of the International Institute for Rural Reconstruction, based in the Philippines.

Gonsalves is known for his work in the field of international rural and agricultural development, and is an awardee of the Sustainable Agriculture and Rural Development Award from Germany, bestowed on him in 1997.

He also won the Global 500 Roll of Honour award from the United Nations Environment Programme in 1991.
During his stint at the IIRR, he has been heading its appropriate technology unit and was also later the IIRR's vice president for programs.

Gonsalves has proposed, field-tested, and developed the participatory workshop process for documenting best practices, now considered one of the more innovative services provided by IIRR.

He has also worked as a research associate at the University of Dar es Salaam, and has organised training, communication, extension, and teaching posts in India.

He served on the NGO Committee of the CGIAR.

References

Year of birth missing (living people)
Living people
Indian expatriates in the Philippines
Rural community development
Indian environmentalists
Activists from Goa